Road 35 is a road in Iran connecting Zanjan to Khorramabad. The important part is the southern part connecting Khorramabad to Kermanshah.

References

External links 

 Iran road map on Young Journalists Club

Roads in Iran
Transportation in Zanjan Province
Transportation in Lorestan Province